The Tulip Bowl is the final match in the season of the AFBN Division One, the top division of the American Football Bond Nederland (AFBN). The AFBN is the organisation responsible for American football in the Netherlands. The Tulip Bowl participants are determined through the playoffs and the match determines the Dutch champions in the sport of American football. The first Tulip Bowl was played in 1985.

There are also other Bowl games, including the Division Two Bowl and the Dyan Kralt Bowl for the youth competition.

History

Statistics

Ranking of teams 

 † Also known as Limburg Wildcats

Records 
Highest Scoring Tulip Bowl
60 - Amsterdam Crusaders 47 vs 13 The Hague Raiders (1987)
Lowest Scoring Tulip Bowl
4 - Rotterdam Trojans 4 vs 0 Amsterdam Crusaders (1996)
Biggest Winning Margin Tulip Bowl
50 - Amsterdam Crusaders 50 vs 0 010 Trojans (2022)
Consecutive Tulip Bowl wins
5 - Amsterdam Crusaders (1987–1991 and 2002–2006)
3 - Amsterdam Crusaders (2008–2010 and 2015–2017), Alphen Eagles (2012–2014)
2 - Rotterdam Trojans (1996, 1997), Hilversum Hurricanes (2000, 2001)
Consecutive Tulip Bowl losses
3 - Hilversum Hurricanes (2003–2005), Amsterdam Crusaders (2012–2014)
2 - Many teams
Consecutive Tulip Bowl appearances
9 - Amsterdam Crusaders (2002–2010)
6 - Amsterdam Crusaders (2012–2017)
5 - The Hague Raiders (1990–1994), Amsterdam Crusaders (1987–1991), Alphen Eagles (2011–2015)
4 - Hilversum Hurricanes (1998–2001)
3 - Rotterdam Trojans (1995–1997), Hilversum Hurricanes (2003–2005)
2 - Many teams

See also
 Belgian Bowl
 EFAF Atlantic Cup

External links
 Tulip Bowl XXXII programmaboekje
 Tulip Bowl on luckyshow.org

American football competitions in Europe
American football in the Netherlands
American football bowls in Europe
1985 establishments in the Netherlands
Recurring sporting events established in 1985